Since the establishment of North Korea, all its three leaders—Kim Il-sung, Kim Jong-il and Kim Jong-un—have been known to use high-security private trains as their preferred method of domestic and international travel.

History
Trains have historically been used by many global leaders and royalty, but particularly military leaders, due to their high speed, security and ability to accommodate extensive office and personal facilities within one mobile location.

Kim Il-sung used a train during the Korean War as his headquarters, and continued the preference after the cessation of hostilities. He started the building of numerous secure palaces, many of which are either directly accessed by or close to railway stations, 19 of which it is estimated are accessed only by the private trains.

Kim Jong-il's preference for the railroad transport was due to his fear of flying. Kim used the trains when he visited army units and factories or travelled abroad. The private trains still serve a network of 19 stations across North Korea (including some underground palaces only accessible by rail).

In December 2011, it was reported by North Korean television that Kim Jong-il died while on a train, during a domestic trip.

Operations
The trains are usually pulled by two power units. It was reported in 2009 that Kim Jong-il made use of a fleet of six personal trains, which are made up of 90 armored luxury railcars. Each armoured train has modern communications equipment, such as satellite phones, enabling the leader to obtain briefings and issue orders while traveling.

Security measures were increased after a 2004 explosion in Ryongchon near the border with China. The explosion, which was believed to have been caused by a train laden with oil and chemicals hitting power lines, occurred three hours after one of Kim's trains had passed through the area. This led to rumors that it might have been an assassination attempt.

The first running ahead to check the safety of railway lines
The middle one typically carries the leader, with a time delay of between 20 minutes and an hour after the first
A third train carries additional security staff, followers and communications equipment

Once a train journey is confirmed, the area around the journey is cleared 24 hours before the three-train set travels.

Travels abroad
Trains also have been used for travel abroad, with direct connection to China, and onward connection to Russia with a gauge-change. Kim Il-sung's longest train journey took place in 1984 when he visited almost every socialist country in Eastern Europe. The train ride went via China, through the Soviet Union, with stops in Poland, East Germany, Czechoslovakia, Hungary, Yugoslavia, Bulgaria and Romania. The rest of the trip went through the Soviet Union, again. A second train accompanied Kim's carrying bogies of the other gauge needed.

On Kim Jong-il's visit to Russia in 2001, the train was reported to have had 22 carriages. Life on board was reported to be luxurious, with regular stops to stock up on live lobster and Bordeaux and Beaujolais wine flown in from Paris. In April 2010, North Korea watchers inferred an unannounced visit to China by Kim, based on the supposed sighting of his train in the Chinese border city of Dandong; soon, however, it was learned that the train in question was just a regular cargo train, and Kim remained in North Korea. In Ulan-Ude, he met Russian President Dmitry Medvedev.

In March 2018, the Kim family's train was reportedly sighted in Beijing, which, along with heightened security around the Chinese government's Diaoyutai State Guesthouse led to speculation that Kim Jong-un and his wife Ri Sol-ju were visiting China. This was confirmed when they met with General Secretary of the Communist Party Xi Jinping and his wife Peng Liyuan. This marked the first time that North Korea's leader had left the country since taking power in 2011.

In February 2019, Kim travelled by train to the Hanoi Summit, where he met with US President Donald Trump for talks about denuclearization of the Korean Peninsula and lifting sanctions against North Korea. In April 2019, Kim took the train to travel to meet with Russian President Vladimir Putin in Vladivostok.

Kim Il-sung's other rail vehicles
When providing "on-the-spot guidance" to the workers constructing Pyongyang Metro, Kim Il-sung used a special funicular-like vehicle to descend to a station under construction (it was riding in the inclined tunnel that was to be eventually used by the escalators), and a railbus to travel around the system. Both vehicles are now on display in the Pyongyang Metro Museum.

See also
 Residences of North Korean leaders
 Rail transport in North Korea

References

Kim dynasty (North Korea)
Rail transport in North Korea
Korea–Soviet Union relations
Rail transport of heads of state